Rikki Mathay  is an awarded broadcast journalist from the Philippines who was born on October 29, 1978 before becoming a Spokesperson and Media Chief in the Senate of the Philippines (2013 to 2018).

Career
Rikki was the youngest news anchor in Philippine broadcast history at the age of 19, when she started her career in ABS-CBN Broadcasting Corporation straight out of college^. Among her most noteworthy news and current affairs programs in ABS-CBN include the following:

Alas Singko Y Medya (ASYM)
A 3-hour daily morning show where she was introduced as VJ Rikki in 2000. A spin-off of ASYM, she hosted Magandang Umaga Bayan as one of the show’s main hosts until 2005.

The CNN Global News with Rikki Kwek
Through a partnership with the international news agency CNN, Rikki was the anchor for this nightly global newscast. She broke the news on the 9/11 Tragedy, among other international headliners.

The Filipino Channel's Balitang Middle East
The flagship program of the first international News Bureau in the Philippines, Rikki pioneered Balitang Middle East as its host/ anchor.

ABS-CBN Breaking News/ Hourly News Advisory
Seven days of hourly news updates from morning until evening, Rikki was able to break the latest news including the Manila Peninsula military standoff, bombing, among others.

Meron Akong Kwento
Partnering with Marc Logan in 2003, Rikki produced and anchored national human interest stories under ABS-CBN’s current affairs department.

Headlines Nightly News
The nightly newscast prior to Bandila, Rikki anchored the lifestyle and showbiz portions of the program, being a first in evening news programs at that time.

News Advisories for FM Station WRR 101.9...For Life
Writer, researcher and anchor, Rikki headed the news division of ABS-CBN's FM station, WRR 101.9... For Life, from 1999 to 2003. The station was dubbed the number 1 FM station according to surveys during that time. ^

DZMM 630 SSS Reports

Her programs, were top rating during her stay, including the FM station of ABS-CBN which ranked the highest in surveys. ^

During her broadcasting career, Rikki was not only a famous news anchor ^  and a sought-after events host ^, but she also served as a young director for Media in the National Commission on the Role of Filipino Women (NCRFW) under then chairman Myrna Yao.
 
After her wedding in 2005, Rikki committed herself to motherhood and philanthropy. In 2012, she joined the office of then neophyte Senator JV Ejercito as his Media Chief and Spokesperson in the Senate of the Philippines.

Print Media

She is currently a columnist for leading national newspapers, Manila Bulletin with her weekly editorial The Right Move, and Bulgar Tabloid.

Net 25 Eagle Broadcasting Network

In December 2022, she joined Net 25 as its news anchor for Mata ng Agila, as well as its news and public relations consultant.

Personal life
Born on October 29, 1978, as Ingrid Baclig Kwek to businessman Nick Kwek and Lilian Baclig-Kwek (of the political clan of Cagayan), Rikki as she was later known in broadcasting, is an alumna of St. Theresa's College, Quezon City where she was a consistent Outstanding Student.  At age 16, she was a freshman at the University of the Philippines, Diliman and graduated Magna Cum Laude at age 19 with a double degree in BA- Broadcast Communication and BA- Sociology. She was inducted into the prestigious honor societies, International Honour Society of Pi Kappa Phi and the Pi Gamma Mu International Honour Society of Social Sciences.

Her school internship with broadcast journalist Gel Santos-Relos for ABS-CBN's long running and top rated travel program, Tatak Pinoy, paved the way to her illustrious career with the network.  

In 2005, she married Cris Mathay ^ and they have two daughters, Cristah and Mischka.

Philanthropies
Rikki was one of the earlier volunteers of the Philippine Red Cross in Barangay Greenhills, San Juan. In 2010, she organized this upscale community to train the first internationally accredited volunteers of Red Cross in Greenhills. She continues to serve as a Director of the Philippine Red Cross.

She has also been active in other non-government organizations that support the marginalized. Rikki has been a board member of Zonta Club International, National Director of the Junior Chamber International (JCI) Philippines, the Parents Auxiliary of the Immaculate Conception Academy, and a supporter of the Tzu Chi Foundation. A devout Catholic and a Marian devotee, she and her husband served as Cabeza de Barangay of St. John de Baptist parish. Rikki was also a spokesperson for the national movement of breastfeeding advocates, Latch.

In 2002, she served as Director in the National Commission on the Role of Filipino Women championing and protecting women's rights which has been her advocacy along with championing health care. 

Rikki is a blogger in the lifestyle website, workingmommah.weebly.com.

References

Filipino sports journalists
Filipino television journalists
Filipino public relations people
Filipino bloggers
University of the Philippines Diliman alumni
ABS-CBN News and Current Affairs people
People from Quezon City
Living people
1978 births
9. https://www.net25.com/article/11039